Robert Jansson  (27 February 1889, in Norra Råda – 15 August 1958) was a Swedish politician. He was a member of the Centre Party.

References
This article was initially translated from the Swedish Wikipedia article.

Centre Party (Sweden) politicians
1889 births
1958 deaths